The Swiss Nationalist Party (abbreviated to PNOS; , abbreviated to PNS) was a far-right Neo-Nazi völkisch
political party in Switzerland founded in 2000. It was classified as "extremist" by the Swiss federal police in 2001.

The party's course was initially imitating that of the 1930s National Front with a clearly National Socialist ideology  (dubbed "eidgenössisch-sozialistisch" by the PNOS) but has since been "modernized" in accordance with the vocabulary of Germany's Neue Rechte.

The party was not represented in any cantonal parliament. Its activities were mostly confined to the Swiss German-speaking parts of the western Swiss plateau. It had one representative in the municipal parliament of Langenthal, canton of Berne (population 14,300), elected in 2004. In 2005, another member was elected to the municipal executive council of Günsberg, canton of Solothurn (population 1,100).

They participated in the federal elections of 2011 in the canton of Berne, gathering 0.3%  of the popular vote (1,066 votes), less than a tenth of the votes required to win a seat in parliament. 
They also participated in Vaud, gathering a total of 132 votes (less than the 0.2% of the votes required to win a seat).

References

External links
 Party website
 Party website for the French-speaking part of Switzerland

2000 establishments in Switzerland
2022 disestablishments in Switzerland
Neo-Nazi political parties in Europe
Neo-Nazism in Switzerland
New Right (Europe)
Political parties established in 2000
Political parties disestablished in 2022
Defunct political parties in Switzerland
Right-wing parties in Switzerland
Swiss nationalism